Thomas Telford School (commonly referred to as TTS) is a City Technology College in Telford, Shropshire and is sponsored by The Mercers Company and Tarmac Holdings Limited. Prior to 2016 the mixed ability school ranked as the top performing comprehensive school in England, and was the first to achieve a GCSE pass rate of 100% A*-C grades. The school was rated by Ofsted as a Grade 1 outstanding school during 2009, and has not been inspected since.

History
The school was founded in 1991 as the eighth of fifteen specialist CTCs set up to raise educational standards in inner-city areas. The catchment area includes Telford, Wolverhampton and the villages and suburbs in between. One of the school's initial main aims was to help relieve the under-performing schools in the urban areas of Wolverhampton. Thomas Telford School previously generated significant funds through the sale of its online curriculum content and qualifications sold through a subsidiary company TTSOnline Limited (Thomas Telford School Online Limited).

In 2009, pupils from the school were chosen to construct Airfix models of planes and tanks, and to assist Top Gear co-host James May construct a life size model of a World War II Spitfire on the first episode of the series James May's Toy Stories.

In 2014 the school was criticised for not sufficiently following up concerns raised by pupils about the nature of a "romantic relationship"  between a member of staff and a pupil. The teacher was found guilty of unacceptable professional conduct.

Information technology
The school has used IT for education, making use of electronic whiteboards provided by Smart Technologies in all classrooms, learning bases and study rooms. The school provides an extranet, which is run using Virtual Office, allowing students and staff to access their files and e-mail from home.

The school has at least one computer and interactive whiteboard in every classroom as well as a total of 200 across the school's four ILC's (Independent Learning Centres). The school has a CAD/CAM suite; which provides access to a Roland CAM CNC milling and machining equipment and a set of 3D printers. The CAD/CAM suite also consists of an HP A1 Pantone printer, HP A3 colour laser printer and HP A3 inkjet laser printer as well as the schools network of other laser printers. The CAD/CAM suite also houses around fifty computers for students to produce work on the various CAD packages the school has which includes the latest version of AutoDesk Inventor.

The school hosts its online curriculum in-house, with a web server and Real Streaming Media Server housed in the computer services department of the school.

Achievements and school life
The school caters for students from the age of 11 through to 18. This is in a system of national year groups from Year 7 to 6.2 (year 13). The school also has a unique and successful system of after school curricular activities called Session 3 which are highly encouraged, and which it claims is pivotal to its success over the past years. GCSE and A level results have also improved year on year and now results are consistently around 100% pass rates. Most students leave Thomas Telford with 12 or more pass GCSES of which most are A or A* grades. In the 2008-09 Academic Year, one student left with 15 A or A* GCSES.

In the 2009-10 academic year the school won two national football finals and were finalists and semi finalists in a further 3. Also the Synchronised Swimming Teams are currently national champions and a former student won a gold medal in the European School Games in 2006. In recent years, the school choir has been invited to perform at the Royal Albert Hall, which is an honour for any choir

In its lifetime the school has made several notable achievements. Its current Headmaster, Kevin Satchwell, was knighted in 2001 for services to education and the community, and from 1998 to the present day, TTS has been named 'the most successful Comprehensive school in the UK', after 100% of its pupils gained 5 or more GCSEs at A*-C, being the first and only comprehensive school ever to do so in 1998.

A rigorous method of applicant selection takes place, including an entrance test to allow all abilities to be reflected and equally proportioned in the school, with the majority of successful applicants being middle achievers and an equal proportion of low to high achievers which reflects the local population. The teachers interview the parents, ensuring that the parents will encourage the students, regardless of their ability.

Ranking and Facilities
Headmaster Sir Kevin Satchwell commented that the school no longer uses the traditional yardstick of five or more GCSE passes at grades A* to C since all students achieved at least 12 GCSE passes at grades A* to C.

The school at one time in the first decade of the 21st century was the best performing comprehensive school in England.

The school's facilities include Swimming Pool, Theatre, Fitness Centre, Astroturf, Football pitches and will be receiving more sport facilities as part of the Building Schools for the Future campaign.

Expansion
In 2004, Thomas Telford School partnered with a local school, Madeley Academy, placing members of its own senior leadership in charge. This has seen exam results improve and other schemes like this across the UK. The academy is now graded Outstanding by Ofsted and is achieving great exam results thanks to the successful partnership.

The school has helped set up two other schools. These are in Walsall and Sandwell; both are now fully built and operational. These are headed by former Deputy Headteachers at Thomas Telford School. All four current academies compete in Inter-Academy competitions throughout the year in a variety of sports

Sponsoring
 The Bulwell Academy (with The Bulwell Academy Trust and Edge Academies Foundation from 2012 to 2018)

Notable alumni

 Sophie Bould - Understudy for 'Maria' in London's West End Production of 'The Sound of Music.
 Sharmadean Reid - Stylist, Founder of Wah Nails.
Danny Guthrie - Footballer who played for Reading and Newcastle.
Connor Goldson - Footballer who plays for Rangers.
Morgan Gibbs-White - Footballer who plays for Nottingham Forest FC 
Omari Douglas - Actor who starred in It's a Sin

References

External links
Thomas Telford School website

Educational institutions established in 1991
City technology colleges in England
Secondary schools in Telford and Wrekin
Schools in Telford
1991 establishments in England